Jiucheng is a town in  Yingjiang County in western Yunnan province, China, located (as the crow flies) around  east-northeast of the county seat, which is in the same valley as Jiucheng itself, and  northwest of Mangshi. , it has six villages under its administration.

References 

Township-level divisions of Dehong Dai and Jingpo Autonomous Prefecture
Yingjiang County